The Men's super -G competition of the 2018 Winter Paralympics was held at Jeongseon Alpine Centre,
South Korea. The competition took place on 11 March 2018.

Medal table

Visually impaired
In the downhill visually impaired, the athlete with a visual impairment has a sighted guide. The two skiers are considered a team, and dual medals are awarded.

The race was started at 11:02.

Standing
The race was started at 11:32.

Sitting
The race was started at 12:12.

See also
Alpine skiing at the 2018 Winter Olympics

References

Men's super-G